Sagid Magomedovich Murtazaliev (born 11 March 1974) is a Russian freestyle wrestler. Born in Makhachkala, Dagestan ASSR, Soviet Union and of Avar descent, Murtazaliev has won gold medals in heavyweight divisions at the 1999 FILA World Championships and the 2000 Summer Olympics.

Olympics
Murtazaliev represented Ukraine at the 1996 Summer Olympics in Atlanta, and represented Russia at the 2000 Summer Olympics in Sydney, where he won gold in the men's freestyle 97 kg competition.

In 2013, he returned his medal to the IOC in protest of its vote to briefly drop wrestling from the Summer Olympic programme.

Politics
In 2001, a bomb was found near Murtazaliev's home in Kizlyar. A charitable foundation is named after Sagid Murtazaliev. On April 12, 2010, Murtazaliev, who had been the head of Kizlyarsky District, became the head of the Dagestan branch of the Russian pension fund. Murtazaliev was a United Russia party deputy to the Legislative Assembly of the Republic of Dagestan. In 2015, the prosecution office opened a criminal case against Murtazaliev on financing terrorism as well as suspected him in relation to a number of murders. Murtazaliev left Russia and is currently wanted by the prosecution.

Family 
Sagid Murtazaliev is married with five children.

References

External links

1974 births
Living people
Sportspeople from Makhachkala
Avar people
United Russia politicians
21st-century Russian politicians
Olympic wrestlers of Russia
Olympic wrestlers of Ukraine
Wrestlers at the 1996 Summer Olympics
Wrestlers at the 2000 Summer Olympics
Russian male sport wrestlers
Olympic gold medalists for Russia
Olympic medalists in wrestling
Dagestani politicians
Ukrainian people of Dagestani descent
World Wrestling Champions
Medalists at the 2000 Summer Olympics